Raymond Fritz (9 December 1898 – 28 October 1979) was a French sprinter. He competed in the men's 400 metres at the 1924 Summer Olympics.

References

External links
 

1898 births
1979 deaths
Athletes (track and field) at the 1924 Summer Olympics
French male sprinters
Olympic athletes of France
Athletes from Paris